Alphonse Vandenrydt (born 12 April 1927) was a Belgian long-distance runner. He competed in the men's 5000 metres at the 1952 Summer Olympics.

References

External links
 

1927 births
Possibly living people
Athletes (track and field) at the 1952 Summer Olympics
Belgian male long-distance runners
Olympic athletes of Belgium